The Thrissur Municipal Corporation is the civic body that governs the Thrissur city in Kerala, India. It is the third largest city Corporation in the state of Kerala by area and fourth largest in population. Established as a Municipality since 1921 under the Cochin Municipal Regulations, it is responsible for civic infrastructure and administration; the distribution of electricity and water for Thrissur city. The Corporation manages 101.42 km of Thrissur city limits of through 55 wards through five zones Ayyanthole, Vilvattom, Ollukkara, Ollur and Koorkanchery. Thrissur Municipal Corporation has been formed with functions to improve the infrastructure of town.

History
Prior to the constitution of the municipality, there was a sanitary board functioning in 1910 under a sergeant and the town council after 1911. In 1932, the new Municipal Corporation Building, Thrissur was constructed. On 1 July 1942, Thrissur Municipality was born and in 2000, it was upgraded by the Kerala Government to Municipal corporation. The first elections to the corporation were held in 2000. Ayyanthole, Ollukkara, Koorkenchery, Ollur and Vilvattom Panchayaths and parts of Nadathara and Kolazhy Panchayaths were merged with the municipality to form the Thrissur Municipal Corporation.

The corporation comprises two legislative assemblies Thrissur Assembly Constituency and Ollur Assembly Constituency. The city is administered by the Thrissur Municipal Corporation, headed by a mayor. Thrissur Municipal Corporation is the second-largest city corporation in the state of Kerala. The city is the only local body and city in Kerala which directly controls power, water supply and solid waste management system in the Thrissur city. For administrative purposes, the city is divided into 55 wards, from which the members of the corporation council are elected for five years. The corporation has its headquarters in Thrissur city.

Revenue sources 

The following are the Income sources for the corporation from the Central and State Government.

Revenue from taxes 
Following is the Tax related revenue for the corporation.

 Property tax.
 Profession tax.
 Entertainment tax.
 Grants from Central and State Government like Goods and Services Tax.
 Advertisement tax.

Revenue from non-tax sources 

Following is the Non Tax related revenue for the corporation.

 Water usage charges.
 Fees from Documentation services.
 Rent received from municipal property.
 Funds from municipal bonds.

Master plans
The first master plan for Thrissur city was sanctioned by the Kerala Government in October 1972 with a plan period of 20 years in accordance with the Town Planning Act. It was expected that the town would accommodate a population of 1,75,000 in 1991. The sanctioned Development Plan (1972) for Thrissur envisaged a growth pattern integrating rural areas and the urban center of Thrissur so as to provide the rural areas with employment opportunities and social amenities. The Town and Country Planning Department (TCPD) and Thrissur Urban Development Authority (TUDA) are the agencies that prepare the plan. A new Master plan, which is in the anvil since last 10 or more years has been a long-awaited dream of Trichurians as people are struggling to get building permits under the existing outdated master plan.

Income
As of 2014-15 revenue, the annual budgetary estimate of Thrissur Corporation is Rs 346.27 crore. Surplus income of the corporation is Rs 6.63 crore. Property tax is the main source of revenue for Thrissur Corporation.

.

Standing committees
There are seven standing committees in the corporation. They are,
 Development Standing Committee
 Welfare Standing Committee
 Health Standing Committee
 Public Works Standing Committee
 Town Planning Standing Committee
 Tax Appeal Standing Committee
 Educational Standing Committee

Mayors of Thrissur

Deputy Mayors

Election results

2020 local body elections

2015 local body elections

See also
 List of Thrissur Corporation wards

References

External links

 Official Website of Thrissur Corporation
 Thrissur Municipal Corporation at wikimapia

Government of Thrissur
Organisations based in Thrissur
Municipal corporations in Kerala
1921 establishments in India